The 2013 Rialto Channel New Zealand Film Awards is the second presentation for the New Zealand Film Awards, a New Zealand film industry award.

Following the demise of the Aotearoa Film and Television Awards in 2012, New Zealand film industry figure Ant Timpson and nzherald.co.nz online entertainment editor Hugh Sundae announced the  formation of the Sorta Unofficial New Zealand Film Awards, also known as the Moas. In 2013 the awards were renamed the New Zealand Film Awards, with the Rialto Channel as the primary sponsor. 

The 2013 ceremony took place at Shed 10 (upstairs) in Auckland on 10 December 2013. It was webcast live at the nzherald.co.nz, and broadcast on the Rialto Channel on 15 December.

Nominees and winners 

Moas were awarded in 28 categories in four groups – feature film, documentary film, short film and television. The television category has only one award – Best Television Feature or Drama Series – a one-off award created to recognise excellence in television, as there is otherwise no New Zealand television award in 2013.

Feature film 

Rialto Channel Best Film
 Shopping – Mark Albiston and Louis Sutherland The Weight of Elephants – Katja Adomeit and Leanne Saunders
 Mt Zion – Quinton Hita
 Mr. Pip – Andrew Adamson, Robin Scholes
 Fantail – Sarah Cook, Matt NoonanFlying Fish Best Director Shopping – Louis Sutherland and Mark Albiston The Weight of Elephants – Daniel Borgman
 Mt Zion – Tearepa Kahi
 Mr. Pip – Andrew Adamson
 Fantail – Curtis VowellVilla Maria Best Actor Hugh Laurie – Mr. Pip
 Demos Murphy – The Weight of Elephants
 Kevin Paulo – Shopping
 Stan Walker – Mt Zion
 Jahalis Ngamotu – Fantail

Villa Maria Best Actress
 Xzannjah – Mr. Pip
 Whirimako Black – White Lies
 Angelina Cottrell – The Weight of Elephants
 Miriama Smith – Mt Zion
 Sophie Henderson – Fantail

Mili Pictures Best Supporting Actor
 Julian Dennison – Shopping
 Matthew Sunderland – The Weight of Elephants
 Temuera Morrison – Mt Zion
 Eka Darvile – Mr. Pip
 Stephen Lovatt – Fantail

Mili Pictures Best Supporting Actress
 Laura Peterson – Shopping
 Antonia Prebble – White Lies – 
 Catherine Wilkin – The Weight of Elephants
 Healesville Joel – Mr. Pip
 Amy Usherwood – Eternity

Apex Insurance Best Screenplay
 Mark Albiston and Louis Sutherland – Shopping
 Dana Rotberg – White Lies – 
 Daniel Borgman – The Weight of Elephants
 Andrew Adamson – Mr. Pip
 Sophie Henderson – Fantail

Nikon Best Self-Funded Film
 Crackheads – Tim Tsiklauri and Andy Sophocleous Eternity – Alex Galvin, Noel Galvin, Eric Stark
 Ghost TV – Phil Davison
 The Deadly Ponies Gang – Zoe McIntosh
 The Death and Resurrection Show – Shaun PettigrewNiche Cameras Best Cinematography Ginny Loane – Shopping
 Sophia Olsson – The Weight of Elephants
 John Toon – Mr. Pip
 Tim Flower – Romeo and Juliet: A Love Song
 Alun Bollinger – White Lies

Mandy Best Editor
 Molly Marlene Stensgaard – The Weight of Elephants
 Sim Evan-Jones – Mr. Pip
 Paul Maxwell – Mt Zion
 Annie Collins – Shopping
 Paul Sutorius – White Lies

APRA Best Score
 Harry Gregson-Williams, Tim Finn – Mr. Pip
 Mahuia Bridgman Cooper – Fantail
 Shane McLean – Mt Zion
 Grayson Gilmour – Shopping
 John Psathas – White Lies

APRA Best Sound
 Dick Reade – Mt Zion
 Dick Reade – Fantail
 Mike Hopkins, John McKay, Michael Hedges, Tim Chaproniere and Tony Spear – Fresh Meat
 Michael Hopkins, Ken Saville, John Mckay, Tim Chaproniere, Pete Smith – Shopping – 
 Steve Finnigan, James Hayday and Chris Sinclair – White Lies

Rodney Wayne Best Costume Design
 Ngila Dickson – Mr. Pip
 Gavin McLean – Mt Zion
 Morgan Albrecht – Romeo and Juliet: A Love Song
 Lucy McLay – Shopping
 Tracey Collins – White Lies – 

MAC Best Makeup Design Hair and Makeup
 Abby Collins, Yolanda Bartram, Vee Gulliver, Andrew Beattie and Main Reactor – White Lies
 Celeste Strewe – Crackheads
 Hil Cook, Ange Duncan, Lea Hoare and Natalie Henderson – Fresh Meat
 Amber D – Giselle

Regional Film Offices NZ Best Production Design
 Tracey Collins – White Lies
 Grant Major – Mr. Pip
 Haley Williams – Romeo and Juliet: A Love Song
 Josh O'Neill – Shopping
 Kirsty Cameron – The Weight of Elephants

Letterboxd Best Poster Design
 Geoff Francis – Shopping
 Tony St George – Eternity
 Connor Kenyon Design – Mr. Pip
 Asmund Sollihogda – The Weight of Elephants
 Damon Keen, Jae Frew and Matt Klitscher – White Lies

Short film 

AUT Best Short Film
 Here Be Monsters – dir. Paul Glubb and Nic Gorman; prod. Nadia Maxwell
 Friday Tigers – Aidee Walker
 Morepork – Fat Boy Films
 Tom's Dairy – Oscar Kightley
 Wide Eyed – Catherine Bisley

Event Cinemas Best Self-Funded Short Film
 Le Taxidermiste – Nick Mayow & Prisca Bouchet Holding The Sun – Dwayne Cameron
 Morepork – Fat Boy Films
 Shelved – James Cunningham, Oliver Hilbert and Leon Woud
 The Sleeping Plot – Ruth KorverAllpress Best Short Film Actor Tony Green – Strongman
 Leon Wadham – Blankets
 Simon Wolfgram – Friday Tigers
 John Sumner – Morepork
 Mac Kaisuva – Tom's Dairy

Allpress Best Short Film Actress
 Rachel Nicholls – Blind Mice
 Aidee Walker – Friday Tigers
 Narelle Ahrens – I'm Going to Mum's
 Kayte Ferguson – Morepork
 Nova Waretini-Hewison – The Sleeping Plot

PLS Best Cinematography in a Short Film
 Andrew Stroud – Echoes
 Roko Babich – Friday Tigers
 Callan Green – Morepork
 Grant McKinnon – Tom's Dairy
 Ryan Alexander Lloyd – Wide Eyed

NZ Herald Online Best Short Film Screenplay
 Campbell Hooper & Joel Kefali – Echoes
 Aidee Walker – Friday Tigers
 Lauren Jackson – I'm Going to Mum's
 Oscar Kightley – Tom's Dairy
 Catherine Bisley – Wide Eyed

Media Design School Best Technical Contribution to a Short Film
 Frank Rueter, David Duke and Bodo Keller (visual effects) – Blankets
 Peter Roberts (editing) – Strongman
 Brighde Riddell (makeup and hair) – The Last Stop
 Dwayne Cameron (production design) – Holding The Sun
 Anton Ognyev (visual effects) – Maul

Documentary film 

Telecom Business Hubs Best Documentary
 Gardening with Soul – Vicky Pope and Jess Feast Antarctica: A Year On Ice – Anthony Powell
 Beyond the Edge – Matthew Metcalfe
 Finding Mercy – Robyn Patterson, Leanne Pooley
 He Toki Huna: NZ in Afghanistan – Annie Goldson and Kay EllmersCanon Best Documentary Director Leanne Pooley – Beyond the Edge
 Anthony Powell – Antarctica: A Year On Ice
 Robyn Patterson – Finding Mercy
 Jess Feast – Gardening with Soul
 Annie Goldson and Kay Ellmers – He Toki Huna: NZ in Afghanistan

PLS Best Documentary Cinematography
 Anthony Powell – Antarctica: A Year On Ice
 Richard Bluck – Beyond the Edge
 Jacob Bryant, Marty Williams – Finding Mercy
 Ari Wegner, Gareth Moon and Hamish Waterhouse – Gardening with Soul
 Jake Bryant – He Toki Huna: NZ in Afghanistan

Lotech Best Documentary Editor
 Annie Goldson and James Brown – He Toki Huna: NZ in Afghanistan
 Simon Price – Antarctica: A Year On Ice
 Tim Woodhouse – Beyond the Edge
 Tim Woodhouse – Finding Mercy
 Annie Collins – Gardening with Soul

Television 

NZ On Air Best Television Feature or Drama Series
 Top of the Lake
 Harry
 The Almighty Johnsons
 The Blue Rose

Lifetime Achievement Award 

 Geoff Murphy

External links 
Rialto Channel New Zealand FIlm Awards

References 

New Zealand film awards
Film Awards
New Zealand
2010s in New Zealand cinema